The Municipal Corporations Act 1835 reformed 178 existing boroughs. It also allowed for further towns to submit petitions for the grant of a charter of incorporation as a municipal borough. There were 62 such incorporations before the 1835 act was repealed and replaced by the Municipal Corporations Act 1882.

1836 – The 178 reformed boroughs

1837-82
Up to 1851, eighteen boroughs were incorporated: sixteen towns that had been enfranchised by the Reform Act 1832 and two of the boroughs unreformed in 1835 were brought under the act.  

In the following years a further seven unreformed boroughs were incorporated and 38 other towns became municipalities. Most of the newly incorporated towns were rapidly growing industrial centres.  A number of coastal resorts were created boroughs, reflecting the growth of seaside tourism, and in 1875 Leamington Spa became the first inland spa resort to gain incorporation.

† Boroughs enfranchised 1832
‡ Borough unreformed in 1835

References

Local government in the United Kingdom
Boroughs of the United Kingdom